With Buffalo Bill on the U.P. Trail, alternately called Buffalo Bill on the U.P. Trail, is a 1926 American silent historical Western film starring Roy Stewart as Buffalo Bill Cody. It was directed by Frank Mattison and produced by Anthony J. Xydias.

This film is available from the Prelinger Archives, San Francisco and the Grapevine video, Phoenix, and is preserved at the Library of Congress.

Several members of the cast and crew of this film later worked on General Custer at the Little Big Horn (1926).

Cast

See also 
 In the Days of Buffalo Bill
 Fighting with Buffalo Bill

References

External links 
 
 
 9 minute excerpt available for free download from Internet Archive
 12 minute excerpt available for free download from Internet Archive
 Lobby or window card
 Grapevine DVD box cover

1926 films
1926 Western (genre) films
1920s historical films
American black-and-white films
American historical films
Cultural depictions of Buffalo Bill
Silent American Western (genre) films
Films directed by Frank S. Mattison
1920s American films